The year 1544 in science and technology involved some significant events.

Botany
 Orto botanico di Pisa botanical garden established by Cosimo I de' Medici, Grand Duke of Tuscany, under the direction of Luca Ghini, who also creates the first herbarium.
 Publication of Valerius Cordus' herbal Historia Plantarum.
 Publication of Pietro Andrea Mattioli's Discorsi ("Commentaries") on the Materia Medica of Dioscorides, adding descriptions of some plants not of medical use, including the first reference to the tomato in Europe.

Geography
 Sebastian Münster's description of the world, Cosmographia, is published in Basel.

Geology
 Georgius Agricola publishes De ortu et causis subterraneorum, laying the foundations of modern physical geology.

Geophysics
 Magnetic dip is first described in Europe by Georg Hartmann.

Mathematics
 Michael Stifel's Arithmetica integra is published in Nuremberg, containing the first European use of multiplication by juxtaposition, the first use of the term exponent, and a table of integers and powers of two considered as an early version of a logarithmic table.

Zoology
 William Turner's Avium praecipuarum, quarum apud Plinium et Aristotelem mentio est, brevis et succincta historia is published in Cologne, the first printed book devoted entirely to ornithology.

Births
 Joseph Duchesne, French physician and alchemist (died 1609).

Deaths
 September 24 – Valerius Cordus, German physician and botanist (born 1515).
 Nilakantha Somayaji, Keralan mathematician and astronomer (born 1444).

References

 
16th century in science
1540s in science